Orna Sagiv is an Israeli diplomat who has served as Ambassador to Thailand and non-resident ambassador to Cambodia since 2021 and Consul General to Mumbai (2008 - 2013). Before she served as Ambassador to Thailand, she was Charge d’Affaires ad interim. She has also served as ambassador to Australia and New Zealand.

Biography
Sagiv was born and raised in Kfar Saba. She completed her undergraduate work at Bar-Ilan University with majors in political science and criminology.

References

Israeli consuls
Ambassadors of Israel to New Zealand
Ambassadors of Israel to Australia
Ambassadors of Israel to Thailand
Ambassadors of Israel to Cambodia
Israeli women ambassadors
Bar-Ilan University alumni
People from Kfar Saba
Living people
Year of birth missing (living people)